Telmatobius brevirostris is a species of frog in the family Telmatobiidae.
It is endemic to Peru.
Its natural habitats are moist montane forest ("cloud forest"), high-altitude shrubland, and rivers. It does not occur in cultivated areas.
It is threatened by habitat loss.

References

brevirostris
Endemic fauna of Peru
Amphibians of Peru
Amphibians of the Andes
Taxonomy articles created by Polbot
Amphibians described in 1955